The 1987–88 BHL season was the sixth season of the British Hockey League, the top level of ice hockey in Great Britain. 10 teams participated in the league, and the Murrayfield Racers won the league title by finishing first in the regular season. The Durham Wasps were playoff champions.

Regular season

Playoffs

Group A

Group B

Semifinals
Durham Wasps 11-8 Murrayfield Racers
Fife Flyers 13-5 Whitley Warriors

Final
Fife Flyers 5-8 Durham Wasps

References

External links
Season on hockeyarchives.info

1
United
British Hockey League seasons